Choteč may refer to places in the Czech Republic:

Choteč (Jičín District), a municipality and village in the Hradec Králové Region
Choteč (Pardubice District), a municipality and village in the Pardubice Region
Choteč (Prague-West District), a municipality and village in the Central Bohemian Region